Shane Beros (born 22 October 1973, in Perth, Western Australia) is a former Australian rules footballer who played for Swan Districts in the West Australian Football League (WAFL) from 1998 to 2008. He was the winner of the 2003 Sandover Medal.

Career
Beros was recruited from West Coast Cowan in the Western Australian Amateur Football League (WAAFL). He made his debut for Swan Districts in 1998, playing 18 games and kicking 11 goals. He played consistently for Swans at WAFL level, and had a break-out season in 2003, winning both the Swan Medal as Swan Districts' best and fairest and the Sandover Medal for the best player in the competition, at the age of 29. He was named captain of Swan Districts in 2004, a position which he held until 2007, and was again amongst the best players in the competition, finishing runner-up in the Sandover Medal.  He won two further Swan Medals, in 2005 and 2006, playing mainly as a back pocket, before retiring at the end of the 2008 season at the age of 35.

References

External links

Shane Beros player profile page at WAFL FootyFacts

1973 births
Living people
Australian rules footballers from Perth, Western Australia
Sandover Medal winners
Swan Districts Football Club players